In Hawaiian mythology, Kaʻōhelo is a mortal sister of Pele, the goddess of volcanos, and the wife of Heʻeia.  Upon her death, she was transformed into  the sacred ʻOhelo shrub.

References

Hawaiian goddesses